General Golitsyn may refer to:

Alexander Mikhailovich Golitsyn (1718–1783), Imperial Russian Army general
Boris Andreevich Golitsyn (1766–1822), Imperial Russian Army lieutenant general
Dmitry Golitsyn (1771–1844), Imperial Russian Army cavalry general
Grigory Golitsyn (1838–1907), Imperial Russian Army general
Mikhail Mikhailovich Golitsyn (Field Marshal) (1675–1730), Imperial Russian Army general